Baltic Tango is a Russian military-historical drama film from 2017 directed and written by Pavel Chukhray, based on the novel "Sell your mother" by Efraim Sevela. Baltic Tango is the first work of Pavel Chukhray after a ten — year break. The film stars Yulia Peresild, Rinal Mukhametov, Sergei Garmash. The film was released on June 22, 2017, on The Day of Remembrance and Sorrow (the 76th anniversary of the beginning of the Second World War)

Plot
The film begins in the German occupation Lithuania in the 1941. Max is a boy from Jewish ghetto, his mother and younger sister were murdered by the Nazis at the beginning of the war. Laima is a Lithuanian, she is a daughter of charcoal burner, who during the war served in the fascist Sonderkommando. The two fall in love, but it is vary difficult for them to understand each other, and it is even more difficult to remain decent people in such historical conditions and political situation. "Baltic Tango" it is a love drama, a kind of story about Romeo and Juliet in the tragic circumstances of the 1940s of the XX century.

Cast
 Rinal Mukhametov as Max
 Elisey Nikandrov  as young Max 
 Yulia Peresild as Laima
 Asya Gromova as young Laima 
 Sergei Garmash as Grigory Ivanovich Taratuta
 Monika Santaro as Ruta, mother of Max and Lia
 Lera Tkacheva as Lia, Max and Lima daughter 
 Andrius Bialobrzeskis as Vincas, Lima's father
 Maria Malinovskaya as Lima's mother
 Andrews Daryala
 Anna Kotova
 Artur Beschastny

References 

2017 war drama films

2017 films
Films about the Soviet Union in the Stalin era
Films set in Lithuania
Films set in the 1940s
Russian war drama films
2010s Russian-language films
Russian World War II films